Tala Tappeh Rural District is in Nazlu District of Urmia County, West Azerbaijan province, Iran. At the National Census of 2006, its population was 3,004 in 925 households. There were 2,319 inhabitants in 745 households at the following census of 2011. At the most recent census of 2016, the population of the rural district was 2,278 in 797 households. The largest of its 19 villages was Tala Tappeh, with 547 people.

References 

Urmia County

Rural Districts of West Azerbaijan Province

Populated places in West Azerbaijan Province

Populated places in Urmia County